Brucea is a genus of plant in the family Simaroubaceae. It is named for the Scottish scholar and explorer James Bruce.

It contains the following species (this list may be incomplete):
 Brucea antidysenterica 
 Brucea bruceadelpha 
 Brucea erythraeae 
 Brucea guineensis 
 Brucea javanica 
 Brucea macrocarpa 
 Brucea mollis 
 Brucea tenuifolia 
 Brucea tonkinensis 
 Brucea trichotoma

References

 
Sapindales genera
Taxa named by John Frederick Miller
Taxonomy articles created by Polbot